The 1996 IBSF World Snooker Championship was an amateur snooker tournament that took place from 15 November to 30 November 1996 in New Plymouth, New Zealand  It was the 23rd edition of the IBSF World Snooker Championship and also doubled as a qualification event for the World Snooker Tour.

Englishman Stuart Bingham won the event by defeating Australian Stan Gorski 11–5 in the final. This was Bingham's first major championship and as a result Bingham won a spot on the professional World Snooker Tour. Bingham however struggled to advance his career further and spent many seasons as a journeyman professional before eventually improving his form towards the end of the 2000s to become a top-ranked player and winning his first professional ranking event 16 years later, before finally winning the World Snooker Championship in 2015, becoming only the second player, after Ken Doherty, to win both the world amateur and professional championships.

Results

References

1996 in snooker
Snooker amateur tournaments
Sport in New Plymouth
1996 in New Zealand sport
International sports competitions hosted by New Zealand